A low-protein diet is a diet in which people decrease their intake of protein. A low-protein diet is used as a therapy for inherited metabolic disorders, such as phenylketonuria and homocystinuria, and can also be used to treat kidney or liver disease. Low protein consumption appears to reduce the risk of bone breakage, presumably through changes in calcium homeostasis. Consequently, there is no uniform definition of what constitutes low-protein, because the amount and composition of protein for an individual with phenylketonuria would differ substantially from one with homocystinuria or tyrosinemia.

History 

By studying the composition of food in the local population in Germany, Carl von Voit established a standard of 118 grams of protein per day. Russell Henry Chittenden showed that less than half that amount was needed to maintain good health.

Protein requirement 

The daily requirement for humans to remain in nitrogen balance is relatively small. The median human adult requirement for good quality protein is approximately 0.65 gram per kilogram body weight per day and the 97.5 percentile is 0.83 grams per kilogram body weight per day. Children require more protein, depending on the growth phase. A 70 kg adult human who was in the middle of the range would require approximately 45 grams of protein per day to be in nitrogen balance. This would represent less than 10% of kilocalories in a notional 2,200 kilocalorie ration. William Cumming Rose and his team studied the essential amino acids, helping to define minimum amounts needed for normal health. For adults, the recommended minimum amounts of each essential amino acid varies from 4 to 39 milligrams per kilogram of body weight per day. To be of good quality, protein only needs to come from a wide variety of foods; there is neither a need to mix animal and plant food together nor a need to complement specific plant foods, such as rice and beans. The notion that such specific combinations of plant protein need to be made to give good quality protein stems from the book Diet for a Small Planet. Plant protein is often described as incomplete, suggesting that they lack one or more of the essential amino acids. Apart from rare examples, such as Taro, each plant provides an amount of all the essential amino acids. However, the relative abundance of the essential amino acids is more variable in plants than that found in animals, which tend to be very similar in essential amino acid abundance, and this has led to the misconception that plant proteins are deficient in some way.

Low-protein vs calorie restriction 

Calorie restriction has been demonstrated to increase the life span and decrease the age-associated morbidity of many experimental animals. Increases in longevity or reductions in age-associated morbidity have also been shown for model systems where protein or specific amino acids have been reduced. In particular, experiments in model systems in rats, mice, and Drosophila fruit flies have shown increases in life-span with reduced protein intake comparable to that for calorie restriction. Restriction of the amino acid methionine, which is required to initiate protein synthesis, is sufficient to extend lifespan. Restriction of the branched-chain amino acids is sufficient to extend the lifespan of Drosophila fruit flies and male mice.

Some of the most dramatic effects of calorie restriction are on metabolic health, promoting leanness, decreasing blood sugar and increasing insulin sensitivity. Low-protein diets mimic many of the effects of calorie restriction but may engage different metabolic mechanisms. Low protein diets rapidly reduce fat and restores normal insulin sensitivity to diet-induced obese mice. Specifically restricting consumption of the three branched-chain amino acids leucine, isoleucine and valine is sufficient to promote leanness and improve regulation of blood glucose. Restriction of isoleucine, but not leucine or valine, is required to observe the full beneficial effects of a low protein diet.

The diets of humans living in some of the Blue Zones, regions of enhanced numbers of centenarians and reduced age-associated morbidity, contain less than 10% of energy from protein, although reports on all the Blue Zones are not available. None of the diets in these regions is completely based on plants, but plants form the bulk of the food eaten. Although it has been speculated that some of these populations are under calorie restriction, this is contentious as their smaller size is consistent with the lower food consumption.

Low-protein and liver disease 

In the past a standard dietary treatment for those with liver disease or damage was a low protein, high carbohydrate, moderate fat and low salt diet. In addition, vitamin supplements especially vitamin B group should be taken. Sodium might have to be restricted to 500–1,500 mg per day.

Low-protein and kidney disease 

Low-protein diets to treat kidney disease include the rice diet, which was started by Walter Kempner at Duke University in 1939. This diet was a daily ration of 2,000 calories consisting of moderate amounts of boiled rice, sucrose and dextrose, and a restricted range of fruit, supplemented with vitamins. Sodium and chloride were restricted to 150 mg and 200 mg respectively. It showed remarkable effects on control of edema and hypertension.  Although the rice diet was designed to treat kidney and vascular disease, the large weight loss associated with the diet led to a vogue in its use for weight loss which lasted for more than 70 years. The rice diet program closed in 2013.

Low-protein and osteoporosis 

The effect of protein on osteoporosis and risk of bone fracture is complex. Calcium loss from bone occurs at protein intake below requirement when individuals are in negative protein balance, suggesting that too little protein is dangerous for bone health. IGF-1, which contributes to muscle growth, also contributes to bone growth, and IGF-1 is modulated by protein intake.

However, at high protein levels, a net loss of calcium may occur through the urine in neutralizing the acid formed from the deamination and subsequent metabolism of methionine and cysteine. Large prospective cohort studies have shown a slight increase in risk of bone fracture when the quintile of highest protein consumption is compared to the quintile of lowest protein consumption. In these studies, the trend is also seen for animal protein but not plant protein, but the individuals differ substantially in animal protein intake and very little in plant protein intake. As protein consumption increases, calcium uptake from the gut is enhanced. Normal increases in calcium uptake occur with increased protein in the range 0.8 grams to 1.5 grams of protein per kilogram body weight per day. However, calcium uptake from the gut does not compensate for calcium loss in the urine at protein consumption of 2 grams of protein per kilogram of body weight. Calcium is not the only ion that neutralizes the sulphate from protein metabolism, and overall buffering and renal acid load also includes anions such as bicarbonate, organic ions, phosphorus and chloride as well as cations such as ammonium, titrateable acid, magnesium, potassium and sodium.

The study of potential renal acid load (PRAL) suggests that increased consumption of fruits, vegetables and cooked legumes increases the ability of the body to buffer acid from protein metabolism, because they contribute to a base forming potential in the body due to their relative concentrations of proteins and ions. However, not all plant material is base forming, for example, nuts, grains and grain products add to the acid load.

See also 
 Essential amino acid
 High protein diet
 List of diets

References 

Diets
Proteins as nutrients